Chen Ying Tang, sometimes spelled Chenying Tang (born July 18, 1988), is a Chinese-American actor.

Life and career
Chen Tang was born in Japan and raised in Guangxi, China, before his family emigrated to Memphis, Tennessee. Both of his parents are ethnic Zhuang people from Guangxi. As a child he began to watch movies starring Bruce Lee whom he considered a hero. After graduating high school, Tang expressed interest in joining the military, but his mother convinced him to head to college instead where he fell in love with acting. His bilingual upbringing helped him secure roles throughout his career including Fresh Off the Boat, Grey's Anatomy and Agents of S.H.I.E.L.D..

In 2019, he was cast in the role of Hong for season 2 of Warrior, "I'm a somewhat eccentric, march-to-the-beat-of-my-own-drum, happy go lucky, a child-like guy who also happens to be a ruthless, deadly hitman for the local tong gang...It was just fun to be given so much free rein to create and do what I felt was right for my role, and have them give me the freedom to meet me halfway in the writing, stunts, everything."

Personal life
Tang is bilingual in both English and Chinese, but naturally possesses a southern accent.

Filmography

References

External links

Living people
1988 births
Actors from Kobe
People from Kobe
American male actors of Chinese descent
Chinese emigrants to the United States
Chinese expatriates in Japan